Georgia Beaton (born 22 June 1990) is an Australian netball player who has played for Adelaide Thunderbirds in the ANZ Championship, for Southern Force in the Australian Netball League, for Team Northumbria in the Netball Superleague and for Contax in the Netball South Australia Premier League. She was a member of the Thunderbirds team that won the 2010 ANZ Championship and of the Southern Force team that won the 2012 ANL title.

Early life and education
Beaton attended St Peter's Girls' School, graduating in 2007. In 2017 St Peter's began organizing an annual challenge match between alumni and senior students. The winners of the match will be awarded the Georgia Beaton Cup. Between 2008 and 2013 Beaton attended the University of Adelaide were she gained a Bachelor of Commerce in Accounting and a Bachelor of Laws. Between 2014 and 2015 she gained a Graduate Diploma in Legal Practice from the Australian National University. She was also a scholarship holder at the South Australian Sports Institute.

Playing career

Adelaide Thunderbirds
Between 2008 and 2011, Beaton played for Adelaide Thunderbirds in the ANZ Championship. She was 17 when she made her senior debut. She was a member of the Thunderbirds team that won the 2010 ANZ Championship

Southern Force
Between 2008 and 2016, Beaton played for Southern Force in the Australian Netball League. She was a member of the Southern Force team that won the 2012 ANL title. She was also included in the 2014 and 2016 Southern Force squads.

Team Northumbria
Beaton played for Team Northumbria during the 2014 Netball Superleague season.

Contax
Beaton was a member of the Contax teams that won Netball South Australia Premier League titles in 2012, 2013, 2015, 2017 and 2018. In the 2013 grand final she was named MVP. She has captained Contax since 2015. She was named the league's best and fairest player in 2013, 2014, 2015 and 2017. She was also named in the league's team of the year in 2012, 2013, 2014, 2015, 2018 and 2020.

Australia
In 2010 Beaton represented Australia at under-21 level.

Employment
Between 2008 and 2013 Beaton worked for as a clerk for Adelaide-based firm Kelly & Co. Lawyers. Since 2014 Beaton has worked as investigator for the Australia Health Practitioner Regulation Agency (AHPRA).

Honours
Adelaide Thunderbirds
ANZ Championship
Winners: 2010
Runners Up: 2009
Southern Force
Australian Netball League
Winners: 2012
Contax
Netball South Australia Premier League
Winners: 2012, 2013, 2015, 2017, 2018

References

1990 births
Living people
Australian netball players
Netball players from South Australia
ANZ Championship players
Australian Netball League players
Netball Superleague players
Adelaide Thunderbirds players
Southern Force (netball) players
Contax Netball Club players
Team Northumbria netball players
Australian expatriate netball people in England
University of Adelaide alumni
Australian National University alumni
South Australian Sports Institute netball players
South Australia state netball league players